Christian Vidal (born 26 April 1972) is an Argentine guitarist, member of the symphonic metal band Therion. He has so far released two solo albums.

Life and career 

Christian Vidal was born in Zárate, Buenos Aires Province. He started playing guitar at the age of eight.

In 2001 he formed the heavy metal band Cuero together with former Kamikaze vocalist Enrique Gomez Yafal. Cuero went for several tours across Argentina and recorded two albums "Cuero" (2000) and "Heavy Metal" (2004).

Christian released his solo album "El Viaje" in 2005. He mixed instrumental rock with different native Argentine styles like Folklore and Tango there. He had toured Spain with that album for two times.

In 2007 he got a place in The Road Vultures, the band had purpose of returning former Mr. Big vocalist Eric Martin. The Road Vultures have already toured with him across South America and India. Other members were Charlie Giardina (bass) and Pablo Garrocho (drums).

For several years he had given guitar lessons at I.T.M.C. (Technological Institute for Contemporary Music), regarding improvisation and chord melody applied to Argentine native music.

In February 2010 Christian Vidal came to Therion as a new guitarist, and took part in recording "Sitra Ahra" album. After that he began the Latin American tour with Therion. It started on 1 October in Buenos Aires. Throughout November and December, they were touring Europe, presenting the band's new work.

In March 2012 Christian were in Sweden recording guitars for the new Therion album Les Fleurs du Mal.

In April 2012 he were on tour with Queen symphonic rhapsody with Thomas Vikstrom, Mats Leven, Michelle Mc Cain.
Celebrating the 25th anniversary of Therion, he was touring Latin America (June 2012) and Europe (Oct – Nov 2012).

Discography 
2000 — Cuero «Cuero»
2002 — Christian Vidal «Instrumental»
2004 — Cuero «Heavy Metal»
2005 — Christian Vidal «El Viaje»
2010 — Therion «Sitra Ahra»
2012 — Therion «Les Fleurs du Mal»
2017 –  Home
2018 – Therion Beloved Antichrist

References

External links 

 
 

 on 

Therion (band) members
Argentine guitarists
Argentine male guitarists
1972 births
Living people